The 1997 SummerSlam was the 10th annual SummerSlam professional wrestling pay-per-view (PPV) event produced by the World Wrestling Federation (WWF, now WWE). It took place on August 3, 1997, at the Continental Airlines Arena in East Rutherford, New Jersey. Seven matches were contested at the event. This event was second to be held in New Jersey with the first previous event in 1989.

The show also included the culmination of a contest in partnership with Discovery Zone with a $1 million prize which nobody actually won. It included several attempted calls where nobody was home. The contest ended after a potential winner failed to guess the proper key to the casket containing the prize money.

The event also marked the first WWF pay-per-view appearance of Michael Cole, and the last WWF pay-per-view appearance of Todd Pettengill, who left the company before returning to host segments and matches of the WWE DVD and Blu-ray release The Best of In Your House: Pay-Per-View Classics 1995-1999 in 2013.

Production

Background
SummerSlam is an annual pay-per-view (PPV), produced every summer by the World Wrestling Federation (WWF, now WWE) since 1988. Dubbed "The Biggest Party of the Summer," it is one of the promotion's original four pay-per-views, along with WrestleMania, Royal Rumble, and Survivor Series, and was considered one of the "Big Five" PPVs, along with King of the Ring. It has since become considered WWF's second biggest event of the year behind WrestleMania. The 1997 event was the 10th event in the SummerSlam chronology and was scheduled to be held on August 3, 1997, at the Continental Airlines Arena in East Rutherford, New Jersey.

Storylines
SummerSlam 1997 featured professional wrestling matches involving different wrestlers from pre-existing scripted feuds, plots and storylines that were played out on Raw Is War and other World Wrestling Federation (WWF) television programs. Wrestlers portrayed a villain or a hero as they followed a series of events that built tension, and culminated into a wrestling match or series of matches.

The featured rivalry heading into the event involved WWF Champion The Undertaker and Bret Hart. On the July 7 episode of Raw is War at Edmonton, Alberta, Hart was announced as the number one contender for the WWF Championship. In an interview with Vince McMahon, Hart said that if he did not win the title at SummerSlam, he would not wrestle on American soil again. The next week, Shawn Michaels, Hart's nemesis, requested Vince McMahon to be a part of SummerSlam. On the July 21 episode of Raw Is War, Hart, his brother Owen, and his brother-in-law The British Bulldog (The Hart Foundation), challenged three American wrestlers into a flag match. Michaels was announced as a special referee for the main event at SummerSlam, and in response to the announcement, Hart attacked Michaels and McMahon. Later, the Hart Foundation defeated the American team that contained the WWF Tag Team Champions Stone Cold Steve Austin and Dude Love, with the Undertaker, where the Hart Foundation won thanks to an interference from Brian Pillman. The next week, Hart challenged The Patriot, a match where Hart lost thanks to an interference from Michaels. After the match, the referees prevented Hart from attacking Michaels while the Undertaker watched from the entrance ramp.

A predominant feud entering the event featured WWF Intercontinental Champion Owen Hart and Stone Cold Steve Austin. On July 6, on the Canadian Stampede pay-per-view, Hart managed to pin Austin in a five-on-five match. The day after it, Austin attacked Hart while he was singing the Canadian national anthem. At the same night, Austin told Vince McMahon that if he did not win the title from Hart at SummerSlam, he will kiss Hart's ass. The next week, Austin teamed up with Dude Love to win the vacant tag team titles in a match with Hart and the British Bulldog. On the July 21 episode of Raw Is War, Hart's team managed to defeat Austin's team at a three on three flag match. The next week, Hart attacked Austin during a WWF Tag Team Championship match against The Godwinns, counting him out. After the match, Austin attacked Hart.

Another rivalry heading into event featured the WWF European Champion The British Bulldog and Ken Shamrock. The two were at opposing teams of the Canadian Stampede pay-per-view. On the July 14 episode of Raw Is War, the Bulldog said that if he lost at SummerSlam, he would eat a can of dog food right after the match. The next week, the Bulldog attacked Shamrock during a match with Vader, powerslamming him on the steel ramp, and making him lose the match via countout. The next week, Bulldog and Shamrock competed in an arm wrestling contest, but as Shamrock was about to win, the Bulldog headbutted him, hit him with a steel chair and poured a can of dog food over him.

Steve Austin incident
The event is perhaps best remembered for the WWF Intercontinental Championship match between Owen Hart and Stone Cold Steve Austin that featured Hart delivering a botched piledriver that legitimately injured Austin's neck and temporarily paralyzed him, leaving him with many years of neck issues and potentially derailing the WWF's momentum in the Monday Night Wars during a time when the WWF could ill afford to lose any more ground to World Championship Wrestling.

In his audio book autobiography, Austin revealed that he and Hart were planning on the spots in the match when Austin (who was booked to win the match and the title) suggested to Hart about performing a piledriver as a false finish, under the condition that it was the knee-drop Tombstone piledriver variant used by The Undertaker as opposed to the more common variant of landing on his butt. Hart said he was more comfortable performing the latter variant but assured Austin that he would not hurt him. Coming off a critically-acclaimed feud with Hart's brother Bret Hart (who gained a reputation of not injuring opponents), Austin obliged.

However, at the planned spot Hart wasn't able to protect Austin's head, leading to Austin to break his neck and temporarily suffer paralysis. (In an ironic bit of foreshadowing, Jim Ross mentioned several times on commentary about Austin's history of neck problems prior to the botched move.) Austin informed referee Earl Hebner that he could not move and that Hart should not touch him. Once Hebner informed Hart, he started buying time for Austin to recover by taunting the crowd that Austin was about to "kiss his ass" (per the pre-match stipulation if Austin did not win the title) until Austin had recovered enough to perform the "worst roll-up ever" to end the match early and with the scheduled finish of Austin winning the Intercontinental Championship.

The injury left Austin sidelined for weeks, during a time when the WWF could ill-afford to have their biggest rising star off of television during their lowest point in the Monday Night Wars, when WCW was in the midst of an 83 week winning streak with WCW Monday Nitro beating out Raw is War. While Austin was able to recover, he continued to suffer neck issues and was written off television at the 1999 Survivor Series to undergo neck surgery, eventually forcing him to retire at age 38 in 2003.

Austin has since stated that his neck is in good shape and he is in zero pain after his neck surgery was successful. The accident was a source of backstage conflict between the two men, but Austin ultimately forgave Hart, and paid tribute to him on Raw Is War the night after Hart fell to his death at Over the Edge 1999. However, Austin did admit that he does regret that he and Hart were not able to fully discuss the incident at hand before Hart's unexpected death.

The botch, while initially appearing fatal for the WWF in the Monday Night Wars, ultimately proved to be a speed bump. However, the WWF still took preventative action, legitimately banning the piledriver in 2000. The Undertaker and Kane were grandfathered to keep using it, as the two were proven safe with the move (though Kane would eventually switch to the much safer chokeslam as his finishing move), while Rikishi began to use the Banzai drop (co-opted by his real-life cousin Yokozuna) as his finishing move. Subsequent wrestlers who used variations of the piledriver on the independent circuit such as Kevin Owens dropped the move from their moveset upon signing with the now-WWE.

Reception
In 2006, J.D. Dunn of 411Mania gave the event a rating of 5.0 [Not So Good], stating, "It was headed into "worst PPV ever" territory until the final two matches. The WWF was trying hard to get things going during the summer of '97, but it would take another year before they started to win the war with WCW. Too much mediocre crap in the early matches is a big part of the reason why. Oddly enough, Austin's injury would turn him into more of a talker for the next few months, and he would get even *more* over with the fans. Plus, it led to the anti-authoritarian character that made all that money against Vince McMahon.
Mild thumbs up for historical reasons and for Foley, Hart, Austin & Undertaker."

The event contained several extended promo segments that did not appear to evoke much crowd reaction. For example, then-governor of New Jersey Christine Todd Whitman was given significant time on the microphone and a championship belt, for lowering taxes on professional wrestling events. In another segment, Todd Pettengill spent significant time calling several people on the phone with no one answering, as he stared at a list of names Tammy Lynn Sytch was holding under her cleavage, for a purported million-dollar sweepstakes promotion.

Results

Other on-screen talent

References

onlineworldofwrestling.com – SummerSlam '97 results
twnpnews.com – SummerSlam
wrestlinginformer.net – SummerSlam '97 review
hoffco-inc.com – SummerSlam '97 review
https://www.youtube.com/watch?v=a67OoVwQlPM

External links
Official 1997 SummerSlam site

1997
Events in East Rutherford, New Jersey
1997 in New Jersey
Professional wrestling in East Rutherford, New Jersey
1997 WWF pay-per-view events
August 1997 events in the United States